Distinguished Service Award is a term for an organization's award for services and contributions. It may refer to:

 Distinguished Service Award (OA), Order of the Arrow, Boy Scouts of America
 Distinguished Service Award, Turkish Ministry of Foreign Affairs
 NASA Distinguished Public Service Medal
 Secretary's Distinguished Service Award, United States Department of State
 Distinguished Service Award, US Department of the Interior   (See Awards section)
 ACM SIGARCH Alan D. Berenbaum Distinguished Service Award

 Distinguished Service Medal (disambiguation), multiple countries